364th Expeditionary Sustainment Command is a Sustainment Command of the United States Army Reserve based at Marysville, Washington.

Structure:
 652nd Regional Support Group
 814th Transportation Battalion
 411th Ordnance Battalion
 654th Regional Support Group
 382nd Combat Sustainment Support Battalion
 385th Transportation Battalion
 96th Sustainment Brigade
 96th Special Troops Battalion
 191st Combat Sustainment Support Battalion

References

Sustainment Commands of the United States Army